Ocansey Mandela Amamoo (born 2 February 1990) is a Burkinabé international footballer who plays for Horoya AC, as a  striker.

Career
Mandela has playedclub football for ASFA Yennenga, CS Sfaxien, Séwé Sport and Horoya AC. While with Séwé Sport he was selected for the 2012 Ligue 1 Team of the Year.

He made his international debut for Burkina Faso in 2010.

References

1990 births
Living people
Burkinabé footballers
Burkina Faso international footballers
ASFA Yennenga players
CS Sfaxien players
Séwé Sport de San-Pédro players
Horoya AC players
Burkinabé Premier League players
Tunisian Ligue Professionnelle 1 players
Guinée Championnat National players
Association football forwards
Burkinabé expatriate footballers
Burkinabé expatriate sportspeople in Tunisia
Expatriate footballers in Tunisia
Burkinabé expatriate sportspeople in Ivory Coast
Expatriate footballers in Ivory Coast
Burkinabé expatriate sportspeople in Guinea
Expatriate footballers in Guinea
21st-century Burkinabé people